SF Express (Group) Co., Ltd. is a Chinese multinational delivery services and logistics company based in Shenzhen, Guangdong. It is the second largest courier in China, and provides domestic and international express delivery. SF Express has a fleet of 69 cargo aircraft, including 37 B757, 17 B737, 13 B767 and two B747 all-cargo freighters, which are owned by its subsidiary SF Airlines. As of 2018, it has transported around 2 million tonnes of cargo, since its operations began in 2009.

The parent company of SF Express, SF Holding trade on the Shenzhen Stock Exchange, and it is a constituent of SZSE 100 Index.

History

SF Express was launched in 1993, providing service between Hong Kong and Guangdong Province.

In January 2010, SF Airlines started scheduled cargo services, with 41 aircraft, to provide services such as one-day and next-morning deliveries.

In July 2017 SF Express used backdoor listing to begin trading on the Shenzhen Stock exchange, involving an asset swap with listed company Maanshan Dintai Rare Earth & New Materials Co.  SF Express was added as a constituent of SZSE 100 Index on 12 June 2017, effective on its first trading day.

SF Express has opened at least 500 Heike — an online shopping service community store, across all Chinese provinces — except for in Tibet and Qinghai. The company had plans to open 4,000 Heike stores nationwide in 2014.

In February 2019, SF Express acquired the supply chain operations in China, Hong Kong and Macau from Deutsche Post DHL. Formed a new subsidiary as SF DHL Supply Chain China.

SF Express operates one of the largest networks of self-service locker kiosks in Hong Kong with 939 kiosks in October 2020.

Gallery

See also 
SF Airlines

References

External links

 

 
Companies based in Shenzhen
Express mail
Companies listed on the Shenzhen Stock Exchange
Companies established in 1993
2017 initial public offerings